Baldwin VI may refer to:

 Baldwin VI, Count of Flanders ( 1030–1070)
 Baldwin I of Constantinople, also Baldwin VI of Hainaut (1172– 1205)